Kallmet i Madh is a village in Kallmet, a former municipality in the Lezhë County, northwestern Albania. At the 2015 local government reform it became part of the municipality Lezhë.

References

Populated places in Lezhë
Villages in Lezhë County